Upala Airport  is an airport serving the town of Upala in Alajuela Province, Costa Rica.

The runway is just south of the town, across the small Zapote River.

See also

 Transport in Costa Rica
 List of airports in Costa Rica

References

External links
 OurAirports - Upala
 OpenStreetMap - Upala
 HERE/Nokia - Upala
 FallingRain - Upala

Airports in Costa Rica
Guanacaste Province